A Girl, a Guy and a Gob is a 1941 film produced by Harold Lloyd and starring George Murphy, Lucille Ball, and Edmond O'Brien.

Plot summary
When Stephen Herrick, a sedate, mild-mannered shipping magnate, loses his opera tickets, Mrs. Grange, the aggressive mother of his fiancée Cecilia, insists upon being seated in the Herrick box anyway. Upon finding the Duncan family ensconced in their box, Mrs. Grange incites an argument that culminates with Dot Duncan hitting Stephen with her handbag.
After the Herrick party surrenders their seats to the Duncans, Dot realizes that her brother Pigeon found Stephen's lost tickets, and the embarrassed Duncans flee the theater.

The next day, at the offices of Herrick and Martin, Stephen is introduced to his new secretary, Dot Duncan. Recognizing Dot as his assailant from the previous evening, he dismisses her, but after she explains the confusion over the tickets, Stephen relents.

Soon after, Dot's beau, wrestler Claudius J. "Coffee Cup" Cup, returns from the Navy, promising to settle down and not re-enlist. While Dot and Coffee Cup are strolling down the street one day, Coffee Cup spots his pal Eddie, who he boasts, can grow four inches just by stretching. Eddie's aptitude for elongation draws a crowd, and soon Coffee Cup is taking bets from the skeptical onlookers. Stephen is drawn into the group when Dot borrows five dollars from him, and when the contest ends in a brawl in which Stephen is knocked unconscious, Coffee Cup takes him to the Duncan house to recover. Stephen awakens to the chaos of the Duncan household as Coffee Cup practices his wrestling technique on Pigeon, Mrs. Duncan delivers a neighbor's baby and Ivory, a sailor, tinkles the piano keys. Stephen is so delighted by Dot's boisterous family and friends that he accompanies her and Coffee Cup to a dance hall and congas the night away, forgetting all about his date with the snobbish Cecilia.

The next morning, an infuriated Cecilia bursts into Stephen's office and finds Dot, who has just fallen from a stepstool, in Stephen's arms. Stephen ignores Cecilia's demand that he fire Dot because he has begun to fall in love with her. One night while working late, the pair listen to a radio broadcast of Coffee Cup's wrestling match, and when Coffee Cup is proclaimed the winner, Dot announces that his winnings will finance their wedding. Dot's matrimonial plans are postponed, however, when Pigeon admits to betting on Coffee Cup's opponent and losing all their money.

The wedding plan is revived after Coffee Cup wins a piano at a raffle and plans to pawn it for an engagement ring, but the piano rolls into the street and is run over by a truck. Next, Coffee Cup decides to raise the money by employing Eddie's stretching virtuosity, but instead ends up in jail for inciting a riot. When Abel Martin, Stephen's partner, comes to work battered from Eddie's latest brawl and tells Stephen that Coffee Cup is languishing in jail, Stephen bails him out and offers to buy the sailor's goodluck ring, knowing that the proceeds will pay for Dot's engagement ring.

After Dot and Coffee Cup are engaged and Cecilia breaks her engagement to Stephen, Abel, an old sailor himself, encourages Stephen to pursue Dot. Stephen, ever the gentleman, concedes Dot to Coffee Cup, who asks him to be best man at the wedding. During the wedding rehearsal at the chapel, Coffee Cup misplaces the ring, and when he leaves the room to search for it, his sailor friends suggest that Dot is marrying the wrong groom. When Dot bursts into tears as Stephen approaches to kiss her good luck, Coffee Cup realizes that his friends were right and sends Stephen to speak to Dot. Coffee Cup then flees the chapel on his motorcycle, with Stephen pursuing him by cab. After Stephen's cab runs Coffee Cup's cycle off the road and into a petshop, the two men fight over who should marry Dot. The cab then speeds back to the chapel, where Coffee Cup deposits the unconscious Stephen along with a note to Dot explaining that he is re-enlisting in the Navy and Stephen is in love with her.

Cast
 George Murphy as Claudius J. 'Coffee Cup' Cup  
 Lucille Ball as Dorothy 'Dot' / 'Spindle' Duncan  
 Edmond O'Brien as Stephen Herrick  
 Henry Travers as Abel Martin  
 Franklin Pangborn as Pet Shop Owner  
 George Cleveland as Pokey 'Pop' Duncan  
 Kathleen Howard as Jawme Duncan  
 Marguerite Chapman as Cecilia Grange  
 Lloyd Corrigan as Pigeon Duncan
 Frank McGlynn, Sr. as 'Panky' Pankington  
 Doodles Weaver as Eddie
 Nella Walker as Mrs. Grange
 George Chandler as Guy Making Bet

Reception
According to RKO records, the film made a profit of $49,000. The New York Times described it as "extremely funny", "full of irrelevant notions".

References

External links
 
 
 
 

1941 films
1941 romantic comedy films
American romantic comedy films
American black-and-white films
Films scored by Roy Webb
Films directed by Richard Wallace
RKO Pictures films
1940s English-language films
1940s American films